Miguel Canela Lázaro (September 29, 1894 – December 1, 1977) was a Dominican conservationist and a diplomat.

Biography
He was born in  Santiago de los Caballeros, Dominican Republic, on September 29, 1894, the son of Pedro Canela (also born in  Santiago) and Dolores Antonia Lázaro (a Spaniard). He received surveyor (1917) and medicine doctorate (1924) degrees from the University of Santo Domingo. He died in Santo Domingo, Dominican Republic on  December 1, 1977.

Legacy
The Rouvière and Canela ligament (shown in Fig. 15 of "Anatomy of the ankle ligaments: a pictorial essay" 
) is named after him and his supervisor at the University of Paris, Henri Rouvière, for their joint work.

Notes

External links
 Miguel Canela Lázaro at Enciclopedia Virtual Dominicana (in Spanish)

1894 births
1977 deaths
Dominican Republic scientists
Dominican Republic medical doctors
20th-century physicians